Bogusław Sochnacki (14 October 1930 – 26 July 2004) was a Polish actor. He appeared in more than 100 films and television shows between 1950 and 2003.

Selected filmography

 Dwie brygady (1950) - Young Actor (uncredited)
 Wolne miasto (1958) - German in Bar (uncredited)
 Zolnierz królowej Madagaskaru (1958) - Man in beer local (uncredited)
 Miasteczko (1960) - Man in Suit
 Walet pikowy (1960)
 Milczace slady (1961) - Soldier (uncredited)
 Komedianty (1962)
 Troje i las (1963) - Maniek Sawicki
 Passenger (1963) - German Soldier (uncredited)
 Yokmok (1963)
 Przygoda noworoczna (1963) - Stefan
 Gdzie jest general... (1964) - German Soldier
 Ranny w lesie (1964) - Alleged Spy (uncredited)
 Spotkanie ze szpiegiem (1964) - Agent on the Truck (voice, uncredited)
 Pięciu (1964) - Rysiek
 The Saragossa Manuscript (1965) - Senor Zoto
 Zycie raz jeszcze (1965) - Partisan (uncredited)
 Glos ma prokurator (1965)
 The Ashes (1965) - Polish Soldier
 Niedziela sprawiedliwosci (1966) - Broda
 Don Gabriel (1966) - Sergeant of the Legion
 Westerplatte (1967) - Sgt. Józef Lopatniuk (uncredited)
 The Nutcracker (1967) - Piekarz (Baker)
 Stawka większa niż życie (1967, TV Series) - 'Wolf' Zajac
 Rzeczpospolita babska (1967) - Sergeant
 Tylko umarly odpowie (1969) - Sgt. Franciszek Klosek
 Dzien oczyszczenia (1970) - Herbert
 Album polski (1970) - Looter
 Romantyczni (1970) - Policeman
 Slonce wschodzi raz na dzien (1972) - Waliczek (uncredited)
 Na wylot (1973) - Man Reading the Sentence (voice, uncredited)
 Hubal (1973) - Gestapo Officer
 Zazdrosc i medycyna (1973) - Izaak Gold
 Pójdziesz ponad sadem (1974) - Windziarz
 The Story of Sin (1975) - Grosglück
 Koniec wakacji (1975) - Nauczyciel (voice, uncredited)
 Dzieje grzechu (1975)
 Czerwone i biale (1975)
 Nights and Days (1975) - Roman Katelba
 Kazimierz Wielki (1976)
 Czerwone ciernie (1977) - Hunter
 Gdzie woda czysta i trawa zielona (1977)
 Okragly tydzien (1977) - King (voice, uncredited)
 Pokój z widokiem na morze (1978) - Strazak
 Nie zaznasz spokoju (1978) - Bozena's father (voice)
 Pogrzeb swierszcza (1978) - Broniewicz
 Plomienie (1979) - Edward
 Bialy mazur (1979) - General (uncredited)
 Aria dla atlety (1979) - Abs (voice, uncredited)
 Zamach stanu (1980) - Minister
 The Quack (1982) - Szynkarz
 Limuzyna Daimler-Benz (1982) - Counter-Intelligence Agent
 Boldyn (1982) - Wanadek
 Karabiny (1982) - Chaplain (uncredited)
 Byl jazz (1983) - Dean
 Epitafium dla Barbary Radziwiłłówny (1983) - Mikolaj Radziwill 'Rudy' brat Barbary
 Co dzien blizej nieba (1984) - Militia captain
 Soból i panna (1984) - Forester Czerwinski
 Katastrofa w Gibraltarze (1984) - Józef W. Stalin
 Wedle wyroków twoich... (1984)
 Nie bylo slonca tej wiosny (1984)
 Czas dojrzewania (1984) - Romek's Father
 Przemytnicy (1985)
 Kobieta z prowincji (1985) - Andzia's Boss
 Mokry szmal (1986) - Spec (voice, uncredited)
 The Faithful River (1987) - Wachmistrz
 Labedzi spiew (1988) - Police Officer
 Republika nadziei (1988) - German colonel
 Kolory kochania (1988) - Suchaj
 Ballada o Januszku (1988, TV Series) - Marian Owocny
 Alchemik (1989) - Kalsken
 Gorzka milosc (1990) - Wydra
 Burial of a Potato (1990) - Mazurek
 Kanalia (1991) - Janitor
 Just Beyond This Forest (1991) - German Soldier Hans
 Skarga (1991) - SB man in hospital
 Zycie za zycie. Maksymilian Kolbe (1991) - Neighbor
 Listopad (1992) - Neighbor
 A Bachelor's Life Abroad (1992) - Foreman Schulz
 Kamien na kamieniu (1995) - Chmiel
 Deborah (1995) - Shopkeeper Rotman
 Dzieje mistrza Twardowskiego (1996) - Burgher
 Szabla od komendanta (1996) - Pan komendant
 Poznań '56 (1996) - Old Darek (voice, uncredited)
 Dzien wielkiej ryby (1997) - Priest
 Syzyfowe prace (2000)
 Oczywiscie, ze Milosc (2002) - Stary straznik
 Zróbmy sobie wnuka (2003) - Antoni

References

External links

1930 births
2004 deaths
Polish male film actors
Actors from Katowice
Recipient of the Meritorious Activist of Culture badge